Bai Fengxi (白峰溪; born 1934 in Wen'an) is a Chinese actress, and playwright. She studied at North China People's Revolutionary University. In 1954, she joined the China Youth Theater.

She married Yan Zhongying; they have a daughter.

Works
Mingyue chu zhao ren (When the Bright Moon Shines), 1981
Fengyu guren lai (An Old Friend Comes at a Stormy Time), 1983
Buzhi qiusi zai shui jia (Say Who like Me is Prey to Fond Regret), 1986
(The Crescent and the Full Moon), 1991 
The Women Trilogy, Chinese Literature Press, January 1, 1991,

References

Sources

1934 births
Living people
Chinese dramatists and playwrights
People's Republic of China writers
People from Langfang
Writers from Hebei
Actresses from Hebei
Chinese stage actresses
Women dramatists and playwrights
20th-century Chinese women writers
20th-century Chinese actresses
20th-century Chinese dramatists and playwrights